Yesterday Started Tomorrow is an EP by the American punk rock band Angry Samoans, released in 1986. The EP featured a major style change, contrasting with their first two albums.

Track listing 
All songs by Angry Samoans unless noted.
"Different World" – 1:47
"Electrocution" – 2:10
"It's Raining Today" – 2:43
"Unhinged" – 1:55
"Psych-Out 129" – 1:54
"Somebody to Love" – 1:56 (Darby Slick)

Personnel 
"Metal" Mike Saunders – vocals, guitar, beats
Gregg Turner – vocals, guitar, acoustic guitar, jug
Todd Homer – bass, vocals, photography
Steve Drojensky – guitar
Larry Robinson – guitar
Bill Vockeroth	– drums
Bill Inglot – producer, engineer
John Strother – engineer

References 

1987 EPs
Angry Samoans albums
Triple X Records EPs
Bad Trip Records EPs